Munns is a surname. Notable people with this surname include:

 Charles L. Munns, American navy officer
 George Munns (1877–1954), New Zealand politician
 Jack Munns (born 1993), English football player
 Les Munns (1908–1997), American baseball player
 Luke Munns (born 1980), Australian musician
 Rana Ellen Munns, Australian botanist
 Ray Munns (born 1980), American DJ